TSCG may refer to:

 Treaty on Stability, Coordination and Governance in the Economic and Monetary Union
 The Saint Consulting Group, a privately held management consulting firm based in Hingham, Massachusetts
 Teniski savez Crne Gore, name of the Montenegro Tennis Association